Coleophora peterseni is a moth of the family Coleophoridae. It is found on Sardinia.

References

peterseni
Moths described in 1983
Endemic fauna of Italy
Moths of Europe